Robert J. McShea (1917–1997), Professor of Political Science, Emeritus, at Boston University, wrote Morality and Human Nature: A New Route to Ethical Theory, and The Political Philosophy of Spinoza.

Comment on Robert J. McShea's book 'The Political Philosophy of Spinoza', by Charles M Saunders, Spinoza author, 'Spinoza's "Ethics" Examined in Detail'. (see- charlessaunders5.academia.edu)
Upon reaching this statement on page 7 in the 'Life and Writings' segment, it became clear that this author was speaking as one who grasps the import of Spinoza's work.
"Too much should not be made of these problems. A grasp of the central message of the "Ethics", Spinoza's most difficult major work can be had on a first reading and without any previous study of philosophy, by any sufficiently motivated student." This is not irony or mockery used here, there are signs, to the experienced Spinoza specialist.
The second and more significant evidence of Dr. McShea's grasp appeared in the footnotes early on which referenced the names of the few Spinoza scholars in the extant: Hallett, Mckeon, Roth, Dunner and Saw.
Very few books on Spinoza's work mentions even one of these true 'leading' lights, let alone all of them.

Boston University faculty
1917 births
1997 deaths
American political scientists
20th-century political scientists